The Pentecostal Assemblies of Canada (PAOC) is a Pentecostal Christian denomination and the largest evangelical church in Canada. It reports 239,267 adherents and 1,076 member congregations throughout Canada. Its headquarters is located in Mississauga, Ontario.

The PAOC is theologically evangelical and Pentecostal, emphasizing the baptism with the Holy Spirit with the evidence of speaking in tongues. It historically has had strong connections with the Assemblies of God in the United States. It is affiliated with the Evangelical Fellowship of Canada and the World Assemblies of God Fellowship.

History

Early history (1906-1925)
The origin of Pentecostalism is widely considered the 1906 Azusa Street Revival in Los Angeles, California. Within months of the outbreak of revival at Azusa Street, Pentecostalism had reached Canada, and by 1910, there were Canadian Pentecostals on both the Pacific and Atlantic coasts, with sizable congregations in Toronto, Ontario, and Winnipeg, Manitoba. A majority of Pentecostals were found in the prairie provinces due in part to the large numbers of United States immigrants who brought their faith with them. Because of these influences, Canadian Pentecostals maintained close ties to their American counterparts.

A 1909 attempt to organize the Pentecostal Movement in the East failed because of opposition against institutionalization. In 1918, however, a decision was made to form the Pentecostal Assemblies of Canada. At the time, the PAOC adhered to the non-Trinitarian Oneness doctrine and there were plans to join the Pentecostal Assemblies of the World (PAW), another Oneness Pentecostal denomination based in the U.S. However, those plans never materialized, and the Canadian body remained an independent organization with no formal US ties. Around the same time that eastern Pentecostals were creating the PAOC, Pentecostals in Saskatchewan and Alberta were joining the US based General Council of the Assemblies of God instead.

In 1920, the PAOC chose to join the Assemblies of God as well. Pentecostals in the West were incorporated into the PAOC, which continued to function as a distinct sub-division of the Assemblies of God. As a result, the PAOC united most Canadian Pentecostals in one denomination. The Assemblies of God, however, was a Trinitarian fellowship, and the PAOC was required to repudiate the Oneness doctrine and embrace the doctrine of the Trinity. This action resulted in the first major split within Canadian Pentecostalism and the creation of the Apostolic Church of Pentecost in 1921 by former PAOC members.

For the next five years, the PAOC experienced growth. It began a national paper, The Pentecostal Testimony, in 1920 and established a centralized overseas missionary policy for improved effectiveness. In 1925, the PAOC asked to be released from the Assemblies of God over differences in missionary vision. This was granted and was an amiable parting, and the two groups have continued to maintain close ties.

Growth (1926-1974)
As the movement expanded, the Pentecostal Assemblies of Canada began to include members from across Canadian society, and larger congregations resulted. For example, in 1928 Calvary Temple in Winnipeg, Manitoba, bought the First Baptist Church which seated 1,500 people, a very large church by Canadian standards even today. 
 
In 1925, the PAOC opened Bethel Bible Institute (Now known as Horizon College & Seminary, which later moved to Saskatoon, Saskatchewan ) in Winnipeg, Manitoba, which was the first of several Pentecostal institutions dedicated to theological education. As time went on, the PAOC established a stronger financial base allowing for the construction of new buildings. Notably, Central Tabernacle in Edmonton, Alberta, (has been demolished, and moved to their new location, now North Pointe, in the north end of the city) was built in 1972 which accommodations for 1,800 and Winnipeg's Calvary Temple completed a new 2,500 seat church building in 1974.

Recent history (1979-present)
Facing the same challenge of many Canadian churches in the latter years of the 20th century, the PAOC worked hard to continue its growth.  Under the leadership of General Superintendent James MacKnight (1983-1996), 102 additional churches were added to the PAOC. A greater emphasis on international missions work since that time has led to growth overseas, perhaps at the expense of causing a plateau in growth within Canada.

According to Statistics Canada, Pentecostal growth has varied (statistics Canada does not collect data specific to the PAOC, but as by far the largest Pentecostal group in Canada, it is likely to reflect the statistics regarding Canadian Pentecostals). The 1991 census showed a 29% increase. Between 1991 and 2001, the census reported a 15% decline to 369,480 adherents (Extrapolating the percentage growth indicates approximately 435,000 +/-2,500 adherents in 1991). While self-reported statistics from the PAOC show plateaued growth, the 2011 census indicates 478,705 adherents - a 29% increase over 2001, and 10% increase over 1991 census data. The Evangelical Fellowship of Canada has pointed out that changes to choices available on census forms over the years brings into question the accuracy and usefulness of Statistics Canada data on evangelical denominations, so it is likely PAOC data is a more accurate measure. The PAOC had "fewer than 225,000 members and adherents as of 1994," which compared with the 2014 data of 239,267 indicates growth of just 6% in the 20-year period.

Beliefs

The central beliefs of the Pentecostal Assemblies are summarized in its Statement of Fundamental and Essential Truths. The statement is consistent with general evangelical and Pentecostal beliefs.

The Pentecostal Assemblies, as stated in the Fundamental and Essential Truths, believe the Bible is the "all-sufficient source of faith and practice" and the "complete revelation and very Word of God inspired by the Holy Spirit". It subscribes to the doctrine of the Trinity, believing that God exists as three persons: the Father, the Son who is Jesus Christ, and the Holy Spirit. The Pentecostal Assemblies believes that salvation has been provided for all humanity through the atonement of Christ upon the cross, and this was proven by his resurrection from the dead. Those who have faith in Christ and repent are born again of the Holy Spirit and receive eternal life. The person who repents and has faith in Christ is justified, not because of the believer's own merit but solely because the believer has accepted Christ as savior.

The Pentecostal Assemblies teach that the sanctification of a believer is both instantaneous and progressive. The believer is sanctified as the Holy Spirit teaches the believer through the Word of God and produces within the believer the character of Christ. Consistent with Pentecostal theology, the denomination teaches that Christians should seek the baptism with the Holy Spirit, which is an experience distinct from and subsequent to the new birth. With this experience comes a more intimate knowledge of Christ and an empowerment to witness and to grow spiritually. The initial evidence of receiving the baptism with the Holy Spirit is speaking in other tongues. Through spiritual gifts believers can minister effectively by both building up the church and demonstrating the presence of God within the church. The Pentecostal Assemblies believes that divine healing is provided within Christ's atonement, and prayer for the sick and gifts of healing are encouraged.

The denomination teaches that the universal church is the Body of Christ and includes as members all who have been born again. Local churches observe two ordinances: the Lord's Supper and water baptism by immersion. The PAOC believes in a dispensationalist and premillennialist eschatology which includes the pre-Tribulation rapture of the church and the Second Coming of Christ.

The Pentecostal Assemblies believe that marriage is a lifelong union between one man and one woman. The marriage vow can only be broken by "marital unfaithfulness involving adultery, homosexuality, or incest". Even in those circumstances, however, the PAOC believes reconciliation is the desired option, and it discourages divorce for all other reasons. It views remarriage as acceptable in the event of a former spouse's death, in cases where the former spouse committed marital unfaithfulness, or if the former spouse has remarried. PAOC members are encouraged to tithe.

Structure

Local churches
The Pentecostal Assemblies of Canada is organized as a "cooperative fellowship". At the local level, Pentecostal Assemblies adhere to congregational polity. Congregations appoint pastors, elect governing boards, and manage their own local affairs.

Districts and branches
Local churches are organized into geographical middle judicatories called districts. A district is governed by a biennial conference, a representative body composed of credential holders with voting privileges and local church delegates. Districts examine and recommend credentials for ministers and elect their own officers. District executives have oversight over all activities of the PAOC within district borders. A branch is a non-geographical administrative unit equivalent to a district; however, a branch's activities are confined to certain ethnic or language groups.

General Conference
The governing body of the Pentecostal Assemblies of Canada is the General Conference which meets regularly every two years. It includes all ordained ministers, other credential holders, credentialed missionaries, and some ex officio members serving in official capacities. Each local church is entitled to appoint one lay delegate to the General Conference, and churches with more than 200 members are entitled to send one additional lay delegate per every 100 members.

The General Executive consists of the Executive Officers, district superintendents, the regional directors of international missions program, five additional credential holders elected by the General Conference, and three lay persons elected by the General Conference. The executive officers include the general superintendent, the assistant general superintendent for fellowship services, and the assistant general superintendent for international missions, all of which are elected by the General Conference.

General Superintendents
George A. Chambers (1919-1920)
Hugh M. Cadwalder (1920-1923)
George A. Chambers (1924-1934)
James Swanson (1935-1936)
Daniel N. Buntain (1937-1944)
Campbell B. Smith (1945-1952)
Walter E. McAlister (1953-1962)
Tom Johnstone (1963-1968)
Robert W. Taitinger (1969-1982)
James M. MacKnight (1983-1996)
William D. Morrow (1997-2008)
David R. Wells (2008-)

Education
There are 7 bible colleges affiliated with  PAOC.

Summit Pacific College, Abbotsford, British Columbia which includes a Graduate School, formerly a separate institution named Canadian Pentecostal Seminary.
Vanguard College, Edmonton, Alberta
Horizon College and Seminary, Saskatoon, Saskatchewan
Master's College and Seminary, Peterborough, Ontario
Aboriginal Bible Academy, Deseronto, Ontario
Global University Canada, Toronto, Ontario
Institute Biblique du Quebec / Quebec Bible Institute, Longueuil, Quebec

Demographics
In 2009, the PAOC reported a total constituency of 234,385 people, an increase of 0.4 percent from the previous year. In the same year, it reported an average Sunday morning attendance of 154,630. In 2010, there were 1,077 affiliated churches.

Also in 2010, the PAOC reported 3,555 total credential holders, 901 of which were women. Senior pastors accounted for 964 of the credential holders, and 43 of these were women. In the same year, 345 missionary personnel were reported.

References

Further reading

External links

Canada
Finished Work Pentecostals
Pentecostal denominations in North America
Christian denominations in Canada
Christian organizations established in 1919
Evangelical denominations in North America